Charlottesville Fashion Square is the only indoor shopping mall in the Charlottesville, Virginia area. It is anchored by two Belk stores. It is a regional mall located about one mile (1.6 km) north of the Charlottesville city limits on U.S. Route 29 in unincorporated Albemarle County.

History
Construction was started on the mall, by the Leonard L. Farber Company, by early 1979, with an opening date set for March 1980. By February 1980, Miller & Rhoads, J. C. Penney, Sears, and Leggett had been announced as anchors, with 75 other interior tenants already confirmed. The mall opened on March 5, 1980, drawing a crowd of 4,000. At opening, the mall had only two anchors, with Leggett not set to open until March 26, and J. C. Penney not expected to open until March 1981.

In January 1990, Miller & Rhoads closed its location at the mall, with merchandise being shipped to other stores recently purchased by The May Department Stores Company. The mall was renovated in 1990, coinciding with the opening of several new tenants such as Gap Kids, Victoria's Secret, and Express. In 1996, the mall was purchased by Shopping Center Associates, from previous owners CFS Associates Limited.

The mall was renovated again, beginning in 1999 and finishing in 2002. The $8.5 million renovation improved lighting and seating within the mall, as well as new decor intended to give the mall a more modern feel, including the removal of umbrella motifs dating to the mall's opening.

On December 28, 2018, it was announced that Sears would be closing as part of a plan to close 80 stores nationwide. The store closed in March 2019. In February 2020, it was reported that the mall was facing "imminent default" on $45.2 million of loans. This came following an increasing number of store closures in the mall, as well as the mall being downgraded to a "non-core" property by owners Washington Prime.

On August 20, 2020, it was announced that J. C. Penney would also be closing in November 2020 as part of a plan to close 155 stores nationwide which left the two Belk stores as the only anchors.

On June 13, 2021, Washington Prime Group, the owners of Charlottesville Fashion Square, filed for Chapter 11 bankruptcy, citing the COVID-19 pandemic as the main reason. The mall was later auctioned to a local lending company a few days later.

See also 
 The Teeth of the Tiger, which caused a minor controversy over its depiction of the mall as the site of a terrorist attack.

References

Shopping malls in Virginia
Buildings and structures in Charlottesville, Virginia
Shopping malls established in 1980